Frederick Jackson may refer to:

Frederick George Jackson (1860–1938), British arctic explorer
Frederick H. Jackson (Rhode Island) (1847–1915), Lt. Governor of Rhode Island 1905–1908
Frederick Huth Jackson (1863–1921), British banker
Frederick Henry Jackson (1938–2003), Canadian politician
Frederick Hamilton Jackson (1848–1923), painter
Frederick J. Jackson (1886–1953), American screenwriter
Frederick John Jackson (1860–1929), English naturalist and colonial administrator
Frederick Stanley Jackson (died 1957), rugby player
Frederick R. Jackson, American soldier and recipient of the Medal of Honor

See also
Fred Jackson (disambiguation)
Freddie Jackson (born 1956), singer
Fredric Jackson (1907–1990), Anglican bishop